In Shinto chronology, the  is the period preceding the accession of Jimmu, the first Emperor of Japan. The kamiyo myths are chronicled in the "upper roll" (Kamitsumaki) of the Kojiki and in the first and second chapters of the Nihon Shoki.

Origin 

According to early mythology, the Japanese islands were created by Izanagi and Izanami, meaning "he who invites" and "she who invites". They find themselves on a heavenly golden bridge staring down at earth and its oceans. With their jeweled spear, called Amenonuhoko, given by the gods or kami before them, they dip the spear into the ocean, creating the islands of Japan, Onogoro Island (“spontaneous-congealed island”). Descending down from the skies, Izanagi and Izanami create their home and create a central Heavenly August pillar. Deciding to populate the land, Izanagi circles the left side of the pillar while Izanami circles the right. Meeting each other on the other side of it, Izanami greets her love "oh, what a comely young man." Izanagi replies with "How delightfully, I have met a lovely maiden." Izanami being a woman speaking first to a man, the gods looked at this as inappropriate and cursed the couple by the children they bore. Their first child Hiruko was born hideous and cast out for its atrocity. Trying and trying again, they fail to conceive a proper child. The gods explain to them both about their curse and decide to give them another chance. Once again Izanagi and Izanami circle the pillar just as before, only Izanagi speaks first. Their mating now was fruitful. Izanami gave birth to the islands of Awaji, Iyo (later Shikoku), Oki, Tsukushi (later Kyūshū), Iki, Tsushima, Sado, and finally Yamato (later Honshū), the largest. They named the land Oyashimakuni, the Land of Eight Great Islands. After that, Izanami gave birth in quick succession to the other minor islands that surround the main ones, and to the main kami of sea
and harbor, of wind, trees, mountains, and so on.

Many other kami were born from Izanami’s womb such as Amaterasu, the Sun Goddess. She was known as "Heaven-Illumine-of-Great-Deity”, and the Moon God, Tsukuyomi. His silver radiance was not so fair as the golden effulgence of his sister, the Sun Goddess. While both sit atop the heavens, they begin their sibling rivalry, quarreling and fighting, they decide they can no longer see each other face to face, thus creating day and night, separating the two.

The last kami conceived was the fire god, Kagutsuchi. During birth, Kagutsuchi severely burned Izanami and eventually slipped away into the Land of Yomi, the underworld. "The tears Izanagi shed at the death of his wife brought forth further deities. Angered by the sight of the newly born fire kami who had been the cause of Izanami’s death, Izanagi drew his sword and decapitated the infant. The blood coalescing on the sword brought forth eight martial kami, including the important Takemikazuchi-no-kami and his peer, Futsunushi-no-kami. Eight more fierce kami of mountains and iron emerged from the infant’s body and limbs."

In his anguish, Izanagi followed her to the underworld to rescue her and soon discovered the awful truth. Nothing remained of his beloved Izanami but a rotting living-dead corpse. As Izanagi runs away in horror, Izanami shrieks in anger for her loves abandonment, "Every day I shall kill one thousand people in the lands we created". Izanagi replies "Every day I shall create one thousand five hundred people".

In popular culture
In episode "Kirinmaru of the Dawn" of Yashahime: Princess Half-Demon, Kirinmaru tells Moroha the quarter demon that "Akuru is a spirit who has been around since the Age of the Gods".

See also 
 Amaterasu
 Jindai moji ("scripts of the age of the gods")
 Kamiyonanayo
 Tsukuyomi
 Yomi
 Japanese prehistory
 Golden Age
 Tenson kōrin

References

Bibliography 
 Ashkenazi, Michael. Handbook Of Japanese Mythology. ABC-CLIO, 2003. eBook Collection (EBSCOhost). Web. 28 Mar. 2012.
 S.H.D.D. "Izanagi And Izanami." Calliope 8.7 (1998): 12. MasterFILE Premier. Web. 28 Mar. 2012

Further reading 
 
 Nussbaum, Louis-Frédéric and Käthe Roth. (2005).  Japan encyclopedia. Cambridge: Harvard University Press. ;  OCLC 58053128

Japanese mythology
Creation myths